The Oklahoma Intercollegiate Conference was an intercollegiate athletic conference that existed from 1914 to 1928 and the first of two conferences to share this name. The conference's members were located in the state of Oklahoma. Some of its teams subsequently joined the Oklahoma Collegiate Conference, which eventually evolved into the second iteration of the Oklahoma Intercollegiate Conference in 1974.

Football champions

1914 – Central State
1915 – Central State
1916 – Kendall
1917 – No champion
1918 – No champion

1919 – Kendall
1920 – Tulsa
1921 – Central State
1922 – Tulsa
1923 – Central State

1924 – Central State
1925 – Tulsa
1926 – Southwestern State
1927 – Oklahoma Baptist and Oklahoma City
1928 – Phillips

See also
List of defunct college football conferences

References